Michael Christensen (born 6 February 1983) is a Danish professional football defender, who last played for Superliga side Hobro IK.

References
 Hobro skriver med Michael Christensen, bold.dk, 11 January 2016
 Hobro siger farvel til syv spillere, bold.dk, 31 May 2016

External links
 
 Career statistics at Danmarks Radio

1983 births
Living people
Danish men's footballers
Odense Boldklub players
SønderjyskE Fodbold players
Danish Superliga players
IK Start players
Eliteserien players
Association football defenders